Ekambareswarar Temple may refer to several Hindu temples in India:

 Ekambareswarar Temple, Chennai, in Tamil Nadu
 Ekambareswarar Temple, Chettikulam, in Tamil Nadu
 Ekambareswarar Temple (Kanchipuram), in Tamil Nadu
 Kamakshi Ekambareshwarar Temple, in Trivandrum, Kerala